Persoonia is an English-language peer-reviewed scientific journal that publishes research within the disciplines of taxonomy, molecular systematics, and evolution of fungi. The journal, established in 1959, is edited by József Geml and Pedro W. Crous, and is published jointly by the National Herbarium of the Netherlands and the Centraalbureau voor Schimmelcultures (CBS) Fungal Biodiversity Centre.

See also
 Christiaan Hendrik Persoon – the journal's namesake
 Mycotaxon – a journal with similar scope

References

External links
 

Mycology journals
Publications established in 1959
Multilingual journals
Irregular journals